Caianda is a town in eastern Moxico province, which is in the northeastern part of Angola, adjacent to the border with the Democratic Republic of the Congo.

Location
The town in a few kilometers from Zambia. It is located on the road between Luena, the capital of Moxico Province, and Mwinilunga in Zambia.

Recent history
In 2004, the United Nations High Commission for Refugees (UNHCR) began organising the repatriation of over 71,000 Angolan refugees from Zambia. The first refugees returned by air, but a new land corridor from Zambia via Caianda for remaining
refugees.

The refugees left Angola beginning in 1974 during the fighting between UNITA and MPLA forces.

External links
Aerial photograph of the town
 
Map

References

Populated places in Moxico Province